Attributional calculus is a logic and representation system defined by Ryszard S. Michalski. It combines elements of predicate logic, propositional calculus, and multi-valued logic. Attributional calculus provides a formal language for natural induction, an inductive learning process whose results are in forms natural to people.

References 
Michalski, R.S., "ATTRIBUTIONAL CALCULUS: A Logic and Representation Language for Natural Induction," Reports of the Machine Learning and Inference Laboratory, MLI 04-2, George Mason University, Fairfax, VA, April, 2004.

Artificial intelligence
Systems of formal logic